Roc de Fer (French: "iron rock") is a downhill Alpine skiing course in Méribel, France, which is part of the large interlinked ski area known as Les Trois Vallées in the Savoie department of France, near Mont Blanc. The course was originally created for the 1992 Winter Olympics and has since played host to the World Cup season finals in 2015 and 2022 and the 2023 FIS World Ski Championships, the latter two in conjunction with the L’Éclipse course in the neighboring town of Courchevel.

History 

Although Méribel has hosted an Alpine skiing slope with a chair lift since 1938, when the resort was developed and opened by a former Scottish military officer and avid skier named Peter Lindsay, and then expanded dramatically as a ski resort after World War II, it still needed a course upgrade when it was designated to host some of the skiing events for the 1992 Winter Olympics, which were centered in nearby Albertville.

According to the official record of the 1992 Games, the Roc de Fer course was developed after studying the sporting aspect and the environmental impact of the new course.   For those Olympics, for which some of the course development was handled by former Olympic gold medalist Bernhard Russi, all five of the women's alpine events (downhill, Super-G, giant slalom, slalom, and combined) were planned for (and took place at) Roc de Fer.

In advance preparation for the Olympics, on 10–11 February 1990, the new Roc de Fer course was opened with two World Cup Super-Gs, both won by Carol Merle. Less than a year later in 1991, Petra Kronberger won consecutive World Cup events in downhill and Super-G.

During the Olympics, some of the female skiers were displeased with being "isolated" in Méribel instead of being housed in a communal Olympic village, as had been the case in the prior Olympics in Calgary.

After the Olympics, outside of a slalom in 1994, the Roc de Fer course remained dormant on the World Cup circuit for twenty years.  But then, a women's World Cup downhill and combined were held on the course on 23-24 February 2013, and the course once again returned to the World Cup circuit.  More significantly, the course hosted the World Cup season finals in 2015 and later co-hosted both the season finals in 2022 (hosting all of the men's and women's technical events (giant slalom, slalom, and mixed team parallel)) and the 2023 FIS World Ski Championships (hosting all of the traditional women's events, similar to the 1992 Winter Olympics, as well as both men's and women's individual parallel giant slalom and the mixed team parallel event) in combination with the L’Éclipse course in Courchevel.

Also, during the 2022 Winter Olympics in Beijing, Méribel held a celebration in honor of the 30th anniversary of the 1992 Olympic skiing at Roc de Fer and the hockey in the town.

Events

Winter Olympics

World Championships

World Cup

Course sections 
Departs des Militaires – Bosse De Anglais – Tunnel – Beage's Wall – La Traverse – Pracua – Le Goulet – Le Stade

One source described the Roc de Fer downhill course as "having a steep start", permitting skiers to accelerate to over 100 km/hour in less than eight seconds, but then requiring more technical skills due to both turns and "many rolls and bumps".

References

External links 
 Roc de Fer (official)

Alpine skiing in France
Skiing in France
 
1992 Winter Olympics events
Alpine skiing at the Winter Olympics
Winter Olympics
Alpine skiing competitions in France
International sports competitions hosted by France